Elthorne was a hundred (ancient subdivision) of the historic county of Middlesex, England.

Toponymy
The name is a standard contraction in Old English of El(ɘ's) thorn – El likely being a man, perhaps one of the eorls (earls) in the same way as Spelthorne Hundred, adjacent, and the thorn would accurately reflect that most of the land, like Hounslow Heath of today, until and unless manually cleared was covered or underlain as it naturally is here with hawthorns, blackthorns and brambles. The most distinctive of these is the sometimes tree-height genus, the hawthorn, which is in warm months heavy with small white flowers and is endemic to the local gravel-rich soil and banks of rivers across all England save for the north and south-west, where its larger type also extends to. Blackthorns are alongside hawthorns the ancient underlayer of the local Ten Acre Wood, an oak plantation. Antiquaries have suggested a meeting-point tree, in the same way as Ossulstone was a meeting point, however, in the same way as "broom" and "gorse" are used whether the noun refers to single thorn tree is unascertainable.

Parishes
It was a north-west portion having these parishes:
Cranford, and Harlington and West Drayton small parishes north of the south-west projection, Harmondsworth
Harmondsworth, the far south-west projection. It as such covered most of the fields and former homes of Heathrow (hamlet) taken up to become London Heathrow Airport
Greenford, between Northolt and Perivale in the east 
Hanwell a strip parish east of Norwood Green. 
Hayes, the south-east half of which was Norwood, a precinct from the founding of its 12th century chapel, then chapelry until its 1859 upgrade to a parish, during the early centuries seeing its Southall manor build up significantly and build its own community. The first mention of a priest in the precinct of Norwood is of Simon, the chaplain of Southall, in 1394.
Yeading developed late in the county in the north of Hayes proper (outside of the precinct). It saw its first mission church in 1890.
Hillingdon, a large area, a fairly neat upright rectangle. The western parish with the main indent of the Colne, a braided river.
Cowley, a parish scattered about in Hillingdon parish
Uxbridge, a chapelry from before 1248 until an 1827 upgrade to a parish. It centred on the town in the west
Yiewsley, a chapelry founded on an old hamlet in 1859, made a parish in 1874
Ickenham, a small parish north-east of Hillingdon and north-west of Hayes
Northolt between Ruislip and Hayes
Perivale, narrowly the bulk and extreme of the small eastern sub-projection
Harefield, with Ruislip the northern projection
Ruislip, with Harefield the northern projection.  Parent parish of Eastcote and Northwood.

It thus closely corresponded to the present London Borough of Hillingdon, plus the western half of the London Borough of Ealing. The eastern third of Ealing is mainly Ealing and Acton which lay in Ossulstone Hundred.

Simplification of complex shapes

Major roads and housing estates have simplified the borders of localities — as shown on each local street name sign in these boroughs. The complexity of many old parish borders of Elthorne hundred has been reduced. This is seen in the modern borders of the local Church of England ecclesiastical parishes, radically simplified. As to the smallest of old parishes most boundaries have greatly changed particularly Ickenham which has shifted west. Local councils have not gone so far as to redefine street signs on the basis of equal-electorate electoral wards. They locally take heed of a fusion of long history, wards and numbered postal districts.

See also
UB postcode area, a similar area but which excludes Ruislip and its progeny (particularly Eastcote and Northwood, see HA postcode area). Most of the UB numbered divisions are loosely based on the original parishes, redrawn for post service convenience.  Harmondsworth by the 20th century attached to other Middlesex areas, such as the Staines Rural District which existed from 1894 to 1930. London Heathrow airport which took much of its area as well as parts of Hatton (a hamlet of East Bedfont) and Stanwell is in the TW postcode area under Hounslow post town.

References and notes
References

Notes

Hundreds and divisions of Middlesex
History of local government in London (pre-1855)
History of the London Borough of Ealing
History of the London Borough of Hillingdon